is a Shinto shrine located in the city of  Shinshiro, Aichi Prefecture, Japan. It enshrines the deified first Shōgun of the Tokugawa shogunate, Tokugawa Ieyasu.

History
The Hōraisan Tōshō-gū was established by Shōgun Tokugawa Iemitsu as a branch of the Nikkō Tōshō-gū within the holy mountain Buddhist temple of Hōrai-ji as part of his rebuilding of the temple in 1648. Abe Tadaaki, the daimyō of Oshi Domain and Ōta Sukemune, daimyō of Hamamatsu Domain were ordered to oversee the construction. The work was not completed until 1651, during the tenure of his successor, Shogun Tokugawa Ietsuna, who had assigned Honda Toshinaga, daimyō of Yokosuka Domain and Ogasawara Tadatomo of Yoshida Domain to the task. Various other daimyō were invited to contribute votive stone lanterns to the shrine, and the shogunate donated the sword used by Tokugawa Ieyasu at the Battle of Sekigahara to the new shrine to give it additional prestige. The shrine was repaired ten times during the course of the Tokugawa shogunate.

The Honden, Heiden, Middle Gate, Ablution font and two sets of carved wood panels on the shrine wall are all designated as Important Cultural Properties of Japan.

See also 
Tōshō-gū
List of Tōshō-gū

References

External links 

Official website

1651 establishments in Japan
Shinto shrines in Aichi Prefecture
Religious buildings and structures completed in 1651
Tōshō-gū
Shinshiro, Aichi